Spoiled Rotten America is a 2006 humor book written by actor, voice artist, comedian, podcaster, and columnist Larry Miller.  The book, originally published by ReganBooks, is a collection of seventeen comic essays. The audiobook version, narrated by the author, won the 2007 Audie Award for Humor.

References

External links

 
 Spoiled Rotten America at Larry Miller's official website
 Spoiled Rotten America at Buffalo & Erie County Public Library
 Spoiled Rotten America at goodreads

2006 non-fiction books
Comedy books
Humour
ReganBooks books